The Lutheran Church of Christ in Nigeria (LCCN) is a major Lutheran denomination in Nigeria, a member of the Lutheran World Federation (LWF).

It was established as an independent church in 1913 from the Sudan United Mission, Danish Branch (SUMD), known today as Mission Afrika. The LCCN now has 2,200,000 members in over 2,400 congregations nationwide. Members of the Lutheran Church of Christ in Nigeria are among the Christians and members of other religious groups being persecuted by Boko Haram, an Islamic terrorist organization.

History

The SUMD first sent missionaries to Africa in 1913 with the pioneers being Niels Brønnum, his wife Margaret C. Young, and Dagmar Rose. Brønnum's wife died shortly after arriving and Rose brought back the Brønnum's infant son to Europe. Brønnum continued his work and established a mission in Numan.

The mission eventually expanded and in 1948, the first five indigenous Nigerian pastors were ordained. By 1955, it was known as the Lutheran Church of Christ in the Sudan and in 1956 became independent as the Lutheran Church of Christ in Nigeria with Pilgaard Pedersen as its first President. In 1960, Akila Todi was elected the first indigenous Nigerian president of the Church. He was made bishop in 1973 when the church adopted a modified episcopal polity.

Structure

The LCCN is led by an archbishop and is further divided into nine dioceses, each led by a bishop. The headquarters of the LCCN is in Numan. The current archbishop is the Most Revd Musa Panti Filibus PhD.

Dioceses

 Abuja Diocese
 Bishop: The Rt Revd Benjamin Fuduta
 Congregations in the city of Abuja, Federal Capital Territory, Gombe State,  Plateau State, Bauchi State, Niger State, Oyo State, Lagos State and Edo State

 Arewa Diocese
 Bishop: The Rt Revd Amos B. Elisha
 Congregations in Northern Adamawa State

 Bonotem Diocese
 Bishop: The Rt Revd Jediel Mumsisuri Nyenbenso
 Congregations in southern Adamawa State

 Gongola Diocese
 Bishop: The Rt Revd Peter Bartimawus PhD
 Congregations in Northwestern Adamawa State

 Mayo-Belwa Diocese
Bishop: The Rt Revd Zethan L. Gajere
Congregations in Southern Adamawa State

 ShallHolma Diocese
 Bishop: The Rt Revd Dimga Jones Kadabiyu
 Congregations in North Eastern Adamawa State

 Todi Diocese
 Bishop: The Rt Revd Clement Dogo
 Congregations in North-Central Adamawa State

 Taraba Diocese
 Bishop: The Rt Revd Joshua Jen
Congregations in North Eastern  Taraba State

 Yola Diocese
 Bishop: The Rt Revd Amos Yakubu
 Congregations in Central Adamawa State

Presidents and Archbishops of the LCCN

When the LCCN was established in 1956, the title of the head of the Church was president. The title was changed to bishop in 1973 and with the establishment of diocesan bishops within the LCCN,  the title was again changed to Archbishop in 1997.

 1956-1960
 Rev Pilgaard Pedersen

 1960-1987
 Rev Akila Todi
 Title changed to Bishop in 1973

 1987-2002
 The Most Revd David Windibiziri
 Title changed to Archbishop in 1997

 2002–2017
 The Most Revd Nemuel A. Babba

2017–present 
 The Most Revd Dr Musa Panti Filibus (also known as Dr Filibus Musa)

Affiliations

The LCCN participates in ecumenical work through its affiliation with:

 Lutheran World Federation
 Lutheran Communion in Western Africa
 Christian Association of Nigeria
 Christian Council of Nigeria
 Fellowship of Churches of Christ in Nigeria
 Joint Christian Ministry in West Africa

The LCCN also works in partnership with:

 Evangelical Lutheran Church in America, 
 Minneapolis Area Synod of the ELCA
 Global Health Ministries
 Mission Afrika

See also 
Christianity in Nigeria
Theological College of Northern Nigeria

References

External links 
 

Lutheranism in Africa
Churches in Nigeria
Lutheran World Federation members
1913 establishments in the British Empire